Sychnovalva chreostes is a species of moth of the family Tortricidae. It is found in Paraná, Brazil.

References

	

Moths described in 2000
Archipini